The Gustav Adolf Grammar School is a secondary school in Tallinn, Estonia. Swedish king Gustavus Adolphus established it as the Reval Gymnasium in 1631. It is one of the oldest extant secondary schools in Europe.

History

1631–1651
King Gustavus Adolphus founded the school as the Reval Gymnasium. Until 1645 it consisted of four forms: quarta, tertia, secunda and prima, in ascending order. The teaching staff consisted of four professors and two colleagues (teachers of quarta and tertia). Pupils were taught rhetoric, poetry, Greek, Latin, and Ancient Hebrew languages, mathematics, theology, history etc.

Architecture
The school buildings were originally constructed in the 13th century as a nunnery. Later the buildings has been rebuilt and expanded on. The latest renovation, completed in 1999, was intended to recover its historical appearance and value. The school is adjacent to the 13th century Tallinn Old Town city wall, which gives the whole complex a unique historic atmosphere and beauty.

Education
Today, the school provides both primary and secondary education. In the secondary stage (gymnasium) students can choose between natural sciences, Swedish, English-Mathematics and English-French direction.

Notable faculty
Alfred Rosenberg (1893–1946) was a short-term teacher at the gymnasium during the German occupation of Estonia in 1918.

References

External links

https://web.archive.org/web/20050914191317/http://www.einst.ee/Ea/architecture/lankots1.html

1631 establishments in Sweden
Educational institutions established in the 1630s
Schools in Tallinn
History of Tallinn
17th-century establishments in Estonia